Ocrisiodes is a genus of snout moths described by Hans Georg Amsel in 1950.

Species
 Ocrisiodes antiopa Roesler, 1988
 Ocrisiodes babaella (Amsel, 1970)
 Ocrisiodes bamella (Amsel, 1958)
 Ocrisiodes dispergella (Ragonot, 1887)
 Ocrisiodes minimella (Amsel, 1970)
 Ocrisiodes occulta Roesler, 1990
 Ocrisiodes polyptychella Ragonot, 1887
 Ocrisiodes ruptifasciella (Ragonot, 1887)
 Ocrisiodes senganella (Amsel, 1961)
 Ocrisiodes sesamella Roesler, 1988
 Ocrisiodes taftanella Amsel, 1950
 Ocrisiodes turkmeniensis Asselbergs, 2004

References

Phycitinae
Taxa named by Hans Georg Amsel
Pyralidae genera